Consular immunity privileges are described in the Vienna Convention on Consular Relations of 1963 (VCCR). Consular immunity offers protections similar to diplomatic immunity, but these protections are not as extensive, given the functional differences between consular and diplomatic officers. For example, consular officers are not accorded absolute immunity from a host country’s criminal jurisdiction, they may be tried for certain local crimes upon action by a local court, and are immune from local jurisdiction only in cases directly relating to consular functions.

Consular and diplomatic immunity in the US

Procedure
Procedurally, official acts immunity is raised as an affirmative defense.

See also
 Diplomatic immunity
 Vienna Convention on Consular Relations

References

External links
 U.S. Department of State - Legal Aspects of Diplomatic Immunity and Privileges
 U.S. Diplomacy - Diplomatic and Consular Immunity

Diplomatic immunity and protection